Antarctic beech is a common name of two species in the genus Nothofagus:

Nothofagus antarctica, native to South America
Nothofagus moorei, native to Australia